Tromm is an Odenwald mountain in Hesse, Germany.

Gallery 

Mountains of Hesse